Daisy London is a British jewellery brand founded in 2009. It has an e-commerce platform and distributor in UK and internationally. It is known for collaborations with celebrities like Cara Delevingne and Laura Whitmore.

History 
In 2009, Daisy London was founded by Ruth Bewsey. It is a jewellery brand that was launched with the Daisy collection. Its first advertising campaign featured Cara Delevingne.
 In 2012, Daisy London became part of the IBB Group of companies.

Daisy London has a network of distributors in the United Kingdom and Europe and global distributors in America, Asia and South Africa.

Notable designs 
Daisy London designs "Chakra bracelets" which have been worn by celebrities such as  Sienna Miller, Cara Delevingne, and Kanye West. The collection also includes necklaces, rings, earrings and diamond bracelets.

Other collections include Good Karma, Halo and Alpha.

Charity Partnerships 

In August 2014, Daisy London worked with Princess Beatrice and Royal National Orthopedic Hospital (RNOH) on creating a charity bracelet to raise awareness for the RNOH where the Princess is a patron.

Other charity actions include donations to the Tumaini Trust and Dress For Success, to benefit the women's charity headed by Mary Portas.

Collaboration with Laura Whitmore 
Daisy London collaborated with presenter Laura Whitmore on a collection in October 2015. The collection was inspired by music and features the recurring shape of the plectrum throughout. In June 2016, new summer festival pieces were added to the main Laura Whitmore X Daisy collection.

References

External links 

British jewellery designers